Elachista nuraghella is a moth of the family Elachistidae. It is found on the Iberian Peninsula, Sardinia, Sicily, Malta and in France, Italy, and Austria. It is also found in Algeria and Tunisia. Records from Bulgaria, Greece, and Turkey refer to Elachista grotenfelti.

Adults are a single colour, white or creamy white, with variably paler or darker grey hindwings.

The larvae feed on Dasypyrum villosum.

References

nuraghella
Moths described in 1951
Moths of Europe
Moths of Asia
Moths of Africa
Taxa named by Hans Georg Amsel